Ptolemaeus (201 BC - 130 BC) was initially the satrap of Commagene, later becoming its first king in 163 BC. He belonged to the Orontid Dynasty, founded by Orontes I. Ptolemaeus' father was King Orontes IV of Armenia, son of Arsames I.

Ptolemaeus was the last Satrap (Governor) of the state of Commagene, a province in the Seleucid Empire. He served under the Syrian Greek Kings Antiochus III the Great, Seleucus IV Philopator, Antiochus IV Epiphanes and Antiochus V Eupator.

Ptolemaeus served as Satrap of Commagene until 163 BC. When the Seleucid Empire began to disintegrate, in 163 BC Ptolemaeus decided to revolt and make Commagene an independent kingdom. Ptolemaeus also declared Samosata, the capital of Commagene under the Seleucid rule, as the capital of his new kingdom.

Ptolemaeus was a relative to King Mithridates I of Parthia. Also, according to fragments of inscribed reliefs found at Mount Nemrut, archaeologists have discovered that Ptolemaeus was a descendant of King Darius I of Persia. Ptolemaeus died in 130 BC and his wife is unknown. His son and successor was Sames II Theosebes Dikaios.

References

Sources
 
 
 
 
 
 

Kings of Commagene
130 BC deaths
2nd-century BC rulers
Seleucid satraps
Year of birth unknown